, usually written 911, is an emergency telephone number for Argentina, Brazil, Canada, Jordan, Mexico, Palau, Panama, Philippines, the United States, Uruguay, as well as the North American Numbering Plan (NANP), one of eight N11 codes. Like other emergency numbers around the world, this number is intended for use in emergency circumstances only. Using it for any other purpose (such as making false or prank calls) is a crime in most jurisdictions.

In over 98% of locations in Argentina, Panama, Belize, Anguilla, Costa Rica, Ecuador, Jordan, Ethiopia, Liberia, Saudi Arabia, Philippines, Uruguay, United States, Palau, Mexico, Tonga and Canada, dialing "9-1-1" from any telephone will link the caller to an emergency dispatch office—called a Public Safety Answering Point (PSAP) by the telecommunications industry—which can send emergency responders to the caller's location in an emergency. In approximately 96 percent of the United States, the enhanced 9-1-1 system automatically pairs caller numbers with a physical address.

In the Philippines, the  emergency hotline has been available to the public since August 1, 2016, starting in Davao City. It is the first of its kind in the Asia-Pacific region. It replaces the previous emergency number 117 used outside Davao City.

As of 2017, a  system is in use in Mexico, where implementation in different states and municipalities is being conducted. Venezuela also has a 911 emergency services called VEN911. It has been in operation for approximately 10 years.

History
The first known use of a national emergency telephone number began in the United Kingdom in 1937–1938 using the number 999, which continues to this day. In the United States, the first 911 call was made in Haleyville, Alabama, in 1968 by Alabama Speaker of the House Rankin Fite and answered by U.S. Rep. Tom Bevill. In Canada, 911 service was adopted in 1972, and the first 911 call occurred after 1974 roll-out in London, Ontario.

In the United States, the push for the development of a nationwide American emergency telephone number came in 1957 when the National Association of Fire Chiefs recommended that a single number be used for reporting fires. The first city in North America to use a central emergency number was the Canadian city of Winnipeg, Manitoba in 1959, which instituted the change at the urging of Stephen Juba, mayor of Winnipeg at the time. Winnipeg initially used 999 as the emergency number, but switched numbers when 9-1-1 was proposed by the United States. 

In 1964, an attack on a woman in New York City, Kitty Genovese, helped to greatly increase the urgency to create a central emergency number. The New York Times falsely reported that nobody had called the police in response to Genovese's cries for help. Some experts theorized that one source of reluctance to call police was due to the complexity of doing so; any calls to the police would go to a local precinct, and any response might depend on which individual sergeant or other ranking personnel might handle the call. 

In 1967, the President's Commission on Law Enforcement and Administration of Justice recommended the creation of a single number that could be used nationwide for reporting emergencies. The Federal Communications Commission then met with AT&T in November 1967 in order to choose the number.

In 1968, the number was agreed upon. AT&T chose the number , which was simple, easy to remember, dialed easily (which, with the rotary dial phones in place at the time, 999 would not), and because of the middle 1, which indicated a special number (see also  and ), worked well with the phone systems at the time. At the time, this announcement only affected the Bell System telephone companies; independent phone companies were not included in the emergency telephone plan. Alabama Telephone Company decided to implement it ahead of AT&T, choosing Haleyville, Alabama, as the location.

AT&T made its first implementation in Huntington, Indiana on March 1, 1968. However, the rollout of  service took many years. For example, although the City of Chicago, Illinois, had access to  service as early as 1976, the Illinois Commerce Commission did not authorize telephone service provider Illinois Bell to offer  to the Chicago suburbs until 1981. Implementation was not immediate even then; by 1984, only eight Chicago suburbs in Cook County had  service. As late as 1989, at least 28 Chicago suburbs still lacked  service; some of those towns had previously elected to decline  service due to costs and—according to emergency response personnel—failure to recognize the benefits of the  system. 

Regarding national U.S. coverage, by 1979, 26% of the U.S. population could dial the number. This increased to 50% by 1987 and 93% by 2000. , 98.9% of the U.S. population has access.

On November 4, 2019, the Northwest Territories launched the  service across the territory with the ability to receive service in the territory's 11 Official languages.

On September 15, 2010, AT&T announced that the State of Tennessee had approved a service to support a Text-to-9-1-1 trial statewide, where AT&T would be able to allow its users to send text messages to  PSAPs.

Most British Overseas Territories in the Caribbean use the North American Numbering Plan; Anguilla, Bermuda, the British Virgin Islands, and the Cayman Islands use .

Enhanced 9-1-1

Enhanced 9-1-1 ( or E911) automatically gives the dispatcher the caller's location, if available. Enhanced  is available in most areas, including approximately 96 percent of the U.S.

In all North American jurisdictions, special legislation permits emergency operators to obtain a  caller's telephone number and location information. This information is gathered by mapping the calling phone number to an address in a database. This database function is known as Automatic Location Identification (ALI). The database is generally maintained by the local telephone company, under a contract with the PSAP. Each telephone company has its standards for the formatting of the database. Most ALI databases have a companion database known as the MSAG, Master Street Address Guide. The MSAG describes address elements including the exact spellings of street names, and street number ranges.

To locate a mobile telephone geographically, there are two general approaches: some form of radiolocation from the cellular network, or to use a Global Positioning System receiver built into the phone itself. Both approaches are described by the radio resource location services protocol (LCS protocol). Depending on the mobile phone hardware, one of two types of location information can be provided to the operator. The first is Wireless Phase One (WPH1), which is the tower location and the direction the call came from, and the second is Wireless Phase Two (WPH2), which provides an estimated GPS location.

As Voice over Internet Protocol (VoIP) technology matured, service providers began to interconnect VoIP with the public switched telephone network and marketed the VoIP service as a cheap replacement phone service. However,  regulations and legal penalties have severely hampered the more widespread adoption of VoIP: VoIP is much more flexible than landline phone service, and there is no easy way to verify the physical location of a caller on a nomadic VoIP network at any given time (especially in the case of wireless networks), and so many providers offered services which specifically excluded  service to avoid the severe  non-compliance penalties. VoIP services tried to improvise, such as routing  calls to the administrative phone number of the Public Safety Answering Point, adding on software to track phone locations, etc.

In response to the  challenges inherent to IP phone systems, specialized technology has been developed to locate callers in the event of an emergency. Some of these new technologies allow the caller to be located down to the specific office on a particular floor of a building. These solutions support a wide range of organizations with IP telephony networks. The solutions are available for service providers offering hosted IP PBX and residential VoIP services. This increasingly important segment in IP phone technology includes  call routing services and automated phone tracking appliances. Many of these solutions have been established according to FCC, CRTC, and NENA i2 standards, to help enterprises and service providers reduce liability concerns and meet  regulations.

Computer-aided dispatch

 dispatchers use computer-aided dispatch (CAD) to record a log of EMS, police and fire services. It can either be used to send messages to the dispatched via a mobile data terminal (MDT) and/or used to store and retrieve data (i.e. radio logs, field interviews, client information, schedules, etc.). A dispatcher may announce the call details to field units over a two-way radio. Some systems communicate using a two-way radio system's selective calling features.

CAD systems may send text messages with call-for-service details to alphanumeric pagers or wireless telephony text services like SMS.

Funding
In the United States and Canada,  is typically funded via monthly fees on telephone customers. Fees depend on locality and may range from around $.25 to $3.00 per month, per line. The average wireless  fee is around $.72.

Monthly fees usually do not vary based on the customer's usage of the network, though some states do cap the number of lines subject to the fee for large multi-line businesses.

These fees defray the cost of providing the technical means for connecting callers to a  dispatch center; emergency services themselves are funded separately.

Problems

Inactive telephones
Some U.S. states required that all landline telephones connected to the network be able to reach , even if normal service has been disconnected (as for nonpayment). In the U.S., carriers are required to connect  calls from inactive mobile phones. Similar rules apply in Canada. However, dispatchers may not receive Phase II information for inactive lines, and may not be able to call back if an emergency call is disconnected.

Cell phones
About 70 percent of  calls came from cell phones in 2014, and finding out where the calls came from required triangulation. A USA Today study showed that where information was compiled on the subject, many of the calls from cell phones did not include information allowing the caller to be located. But if a call was made from a large building, even that would not be enough to precisely locate the caller. New federal rules, which service providers helped with, require location information for 40 percent of calls by 2017 and 80 percent by 2021.

 80 percent of  calls in the United States were made on cell phones, but the ability to do so by text messaging was not required. Text-to-911 was first used in Iowa in 2009. According to the FCC, only 1,600 of about 6,000  call centers had the ability, up from 650 in 2016.

Internet telephony

If  is dialed from a commercial Voice over Internet Protocol (VoIP) service, depending on how the provider handles such calls, the call may not go anywhere at all, or it may go to a non-emergency number at the public safety answering point associated with the billing or service address of the caller. Because a VoIP adapter can be plugged into any broadband internet connection, a caller could be hundreds or even thousands of miles away from home, yet if the call goes to an answering point at all, it would be the one associated with the caller's address and not the actual location of the call. It may never be possible to reliably and accurately identify the location of a VoIP user, even if a GPS receiver is installed in the VoIP adapter, since such phones are normally used indoors, and thus may be unable to get a signal.

In March 2005, commercial Internet telephony provider Vonage was sued by the Texas Attorney General, who alleged that their website and other sales and service documentation did not make clear enough that Vonage's provision of  service was not done traditionally. In May 2005, the FCC issued an order requiring VoIP providers to offer  service to all their subscribers within 120 days of the order being published. In Canada, the federal regulators have required Internet service providers (ISPs) to provide an equivalent service to the conventional PSAPs, but even these encounter problems with caller location, since their databases rely on company billing addresses.

In May 2010, most VoIP users who dial  are connected to a call center owned by their telephone company, or contracted by them. The operators are most often not trained emergency service providers and are only there to do their best to connect the caller to the appropriate emergency service. If the call center can determine the location of the emergency they try to transfer the caller to the appropriate PSAP. Most often the caller ends up being directed to a PSAP in the general area of the emergency. A  operator at that PSAP must then determine the location of the emergency.

VoIP services operating in Canada are required to provide  emergency service. In April 2008, an 18-month-old boy in Calgary, Alberta, died after a Toronto VoIP provider's  operator had an ambulance dispatched to the address of the family's previous abode in Mississauga, Ontario.

Emergencies across jurisdictions
When a caller dials , the call is routed to the local public safety answering point. However, if the caller is reporting an emergency in another jurisdiction, the dispatchers may or may not know how to contact the proper authorities. The publicly posted phone numbers for most police departments in the U.S. are non-emergency numbers that often specifically instruct callers to dial  in case of emergency, which does not resolve the issue for callers outside of the jurisdiction.

NENA has developed the North American  Resource Database which includes the National PSAP Registry. PSAPs can query this database to obtain emergency contact information of a PSAP in another county or state when it receives a call involving another jurisdiction. Online access to this database is provided at no charge for authorized local and state  authorities.

See also 

 3-1-1, non-emergency number
 4-1-1
 9-1-1 Tapping Protocol
 N11 code
 Dial 1119, a 1950 MGM feature film that portrays "1119" as a police emergency number
 eCall
 Emergency medical dispatcher
 Emergency telephone
 Emergency telephone number
 Enhanced 9-1-1
 Friendly caller program
 In Case of Emergency
 Next Generation 9-1-1
 Reverse 9-1-1
 Text-to-9-1-1

References

External links

9-1-1 Services, Web site of 9-1-1 Services in Canada.
911.gov, Web site of the 911 Program in the United States.

Telecommunications-related introductions in 1968
Emergency telephone numbers
Federal Communications Commission
Three-digit telephone numbers